Mitre (433–466) was a Catholic saint, who was born in Thessaloniki, Greece, and died in Aix-en-Provence.

Biography
According to the legend, Mitre, a field worker living in Aix-en-Provence with Arvendus, was charged with witchcraft for making a miracle come true. He was beheaded. He then picked up his head and took it to a church in Aix, Église Notre-Dame de la Seds. 

On 23 October 1383 his relics were moved to the Cathédrale Saint-Sauveur in Aix-en-Provence. It is said that the right-hand column holding his tombstone had a shining hole in it, giving out a liquid good for curing .

Saint Mitre to this day
A chapel named after Saint-Mitre was built in Aix-en-Provence in the  17th century.
The Cathédrale Saint-Sauveur holds a painting by Nicolas Froment, Légende de saint Mitre, dating back to 1470–1475.
Saint-Mitre-les-Remparts was named after him.
Émile Zola mentions Saint Mitre in the first chapter of La Fortune des Rougon.

References

Les Rues d'Aix, Ambroise Roux-Alphéran, 1846–1848.

433 births
466 deaths
Ancient Thessalonians
People from Provence-Alpes-Côte d'Azur
5th-century Christian saints